Friedrich-Wilhelm von Loeper (3 August 1888 – 7 October 1983) was a German general (Generalleutnant) in the Wehrmacht during World War II who commanded several divisions. He was a recipient of the Knight's Cross of the Iron Cross.

He was married to Irene Kühne (1891-1984) daughter of Erich Kühne, of Wanzleben.

Awards

 Knight's Cross of the Iron Cross on 29 September 1941 as Generalleutnant and commander of 10. Infanterie-Division

References

Citations

Bibliography

1888 births
1983 deaths
German Army personnel of World War I
German prisoners of war in World War II
Lieutenant generals of the German Army (Wehrmacht)
People from the Province of Silesia
People from Strzelin County
Prussian Army personnel
Recipients of the clasp to the Iron Cross, 1st class
Recipients of the Knight's Cross of the Iron Cross
German Army generals of World War II